"Don't Stop Now" is a 2007 song by Crowded House.

Don't Stop Now may also refer to:
 Don't Stop Now (Bonnie Davis song), 1943
 "Don't Stop Now", a song on the album Black & White by the Maine
 "Don't Stop Now", a novel by Julie Buxbaum